Alejandro R. Jadad Bechara  (Alex Jadad) (born August 9, 1963) is a Canadian-Colombian physician whose work focuses on the creation of a pandemic of health through digital technologies and collaboration across traditional boundaries. He is also known as the researcher responsible for the development of the Jadad Scale, the first validated tool to assess the methodological quality of clinical trials.

Early years 
Jadad was born in Medellín, and grew up in Montería, Colombia. When he was a medical student, he conducted the first studies on the jargon, the chemical composition and the clinical implications of a drug called 'basuco' in Colombia, which soon became known worldwide as "crack" cocaine. He obtained his medical degree in 1986 at the Pontificia Universidad Javeriana in Bogota, where he also became a specialist in anesthesiology and intensive care. In 1989, he received a grant from the British Council, and became Clinical Research Fellow at the Oxford Pain Relief Pain Unit, University of Oxford, where he trained in pain management and end of life care, and conducted research that demonstrated that neuropathic pain ("pain in numb areas due to nerve damage") could be relieved by opioids. This work led to the 1992 Overseas Research Student Award from the Committee of Vice-Chancellors and Principals of the Universities of the United Kingdom, and his enrolment as a doctoral student in Balliol College, the oldest school in the University of Oxford, where he received in 1994 the degree of Doctor of Philosophy (DPhil) in Clinical Medicine. His doctoral thesis, entitled "Meta-analysis of Controlled Trials on Pain Relief", was published and widely disseminated by the British National Health Service (NHS). It guided the development of new tools to identify and distill health-related information, methods to handle big data to support health-related decisions, and the validation of the Jadad scale.

The Jadad Scale 
This was the first validated tool to assess the methodological quality of clinical trials in the world. As of 2022, it had been cited more than 23,000 times in the biomedical literature, being used to identify systematic differences among studies of the same healthcare interventions in more than 5,000 reviews of research in virtually all areas in the healthcare sector. The scale includes three components which are directly related to the reduction of bias: randomization, blinding, and the description of dropouts and withdrawals. These are presented as 'yes' or 'no' questions and produces scores that range from 0 to 5. Studies that receive a score of 2 points or less has been shown to exaggerate the produce treatment effects that are 35% larger on average than those produced by the trials with 3 or more points.

Life in Canada 
In 1995, Jadad joined McMaster University in Canada, where he stayed until 1999. During this period, he was Director of the Health Information Research Unit; Co-director of the Canadian Cochrane Centre and Network, Associate Medical Director of the Program in Evidence-based on Cancer Care Ontario, and the Founding Director of the McMaster Evidence-based Practice Center (the first of its kind funded by the US government overseas), and Professor in the Department of Clinical Epidemiology and Biostatistics.

In 2000, Jadad moved to Toronto as the Inaugural Rose Family Chair in Supportive Care (a post he held until 2010), which enabled work on the reconceptualization of terms such as 'health' or a 'good death', as a means to guide the design, development, implementation and evaluation of innovations aimed at allowing people, even those living with complex chronic conditions or even terminal illnesses, to consider themselves to be healthy until the end. Simultaneously, he became the Founding Director of the Program in eHealth Innovation and Professor in the Department of Anesthesia in the Faculty of Medicine, and in the Institute for Health Policy, Management and Evaluation at the University of Toronto. In this capacity, he led the creation of the Centre for Global eHealth Innovation, a simulator of the future, to study and optimize the use of the information and communication technologies (ICTs) before their introduction into the health system. The construction of the centre was supported by the Canada Foundation for Innovation and the University Health Network, the largest hospital in Canada, where it is located. During this time, he also led the development of virtual clinical tools to transform the encounter between patients and health professionals, and new ways of using ICTs to respond to major threats to public health (e.g., obesity, complex chronic diseases and challenges at the end of life) and to allow the public (especially young people) to guide the creation of the future of the health system. To support this work, in 2002, Jadad was awarded the Canada Research Chair in eHealth Innovation (Tier 1), which he held until 2015. From 2016 to 2019, he was Director of the Institute for Global Health Equity and Innovation, University of Toronto.

Global activities 
In 1992, Jadad became the inaugural President of the Colombian Science and Technology Network in the UK, which was part of the Caldas Network, supported by Colciencias, in order to connect the country's scientific diaspora, worldwide.

In 1998, he authored the book with which the British Medical Journal celebrated the 50th anniversary of modern clinical trials. A new edition, co-written with Murray Enkin, was published in 2007.

In 2008, Jadad led a global conversation about the meaning of health, supported by the British Medical Journal.

In 2010, he was the Editor-in-Chief of When people live with multiple chronic diseases: A collaborative approach to an emerging global challenge, one of the first books in medicine co-created globally using digital technologies. The same year, he chaired and convened the Global People-Centered eHealth Innovation Forum in the European Ministerial Conference; the First International Youth-Led Innovation Forum to promote entrepreneurship among millennials and centennials in Brussels and Extremadura; and the First International Summit on Family-Centered Health, supported by the government of China

In 2019, he became a member of the Council of the Wise, a group of 43 experts in eight different areas charged by the government of Colombia to produce recommendations about the future of the country in the following 25 years.

In 2021, he was selected as one of the members of the Public Health Leadership Coalition, a group assembled by the World Federation of Public Health Associations to foster evidence-informed decisions about the COVID-19 pandemic and other major existential health threats.

Books 
 Jadad AR. Medical education, professional practice and drug abuse among physicians [Educación médica, práctica profesional y abuso de drogas entre los médicos] Xavierian University Press, Bogota, 1988
 Ruiz AM, Jadad AR. The neurosurgical patient: anesthetic and intensive care: Copilito Press, 1989 [Original title in Spanish: El paciente neuroquirúrgico: manejo anestésico y de cuidados intensivos (with Mario Ruiz Pelaez)
 Jadad AR. Randomized Controlled Trials: A User's Guide. London: BMJ Publishing Group, 1998
 Jadad AR, Enkin MW. Randomized Controlled Trials: Questions, Answers and Musings. Wiley, 2007 
 Jadad AR. Unlearning: incomplete musings on the game of life and the illusions that keep us playing. Foresight Links Press, 2008
 Jadad AR, Cabrera A, Martos F, Smith R, Lyons RF. "When people live with multiple chronic diseases: a collaborative approach to an emerging global challenge". Granada: Andalusian School of Public Health, 2010
 Jadad AR. The Feast of Our Life: Flourishing through self-love. Beati Press, 2016
 Herrera-Molina E, Jadad-Garcia T, Librada S, Alvarez A, Rodriguez Z, Lucas MA, Jadad AR (Editor-in-Chief and Senior Author). Beginning from the End: How to transform end of life care by bringing together the power of healthcare, social services and the community. 1st edition. Seville, Spain: New Health Foundation, 2017
 Jadad AR (editor-in-chief and senior author), Arango A, Sepulveda JHD, Espinal S, Rodriguez DG, Wind KS. Unleashing A Pandemic of Health from the workplace: Believing is seeing. 1st edition, Toronto: Beati Inc., 2017.
 Serra M, Ospina-Palacio D, Espinal S, Rodriguez D, Jadad AR (Editor-in-Chief). Trusted networks: the key to achieve world-class outcomes on a shoestring. 1st edition, Toronto: Beati Inc., 2018.
 Espinosa N, Anez M, Serra M, Espinal S, Rodriguez D, Jadad AR. Toward sustainable well-being for all: People, communities, organizations, societies and creatures. Beati Inc. 2020.
 Jadad A, Jadad-Garcia T. Healthy No Matter What: How Humans Are Hardwired to Adapt. Crown/Penguin Random House. 2023

Personal 
Jadad lives in Toronto with Martha Garcia, his wife, whom he started dating when he was 17. They have two daughters and two grandchildren.

Scopus Profile = Author ID: 35430539800

References 

1963 births
Living people
Canadian anesthesiologists
Colombian physicians
People from Medellín
Pontifical Xavierian University alumni